The 2017 Le Mans Cup, known as the 2017 Michelin Le Mans Cup under sponsorship, was the second season of the Le Mans Cup. It began on 13 May at the Autodromo Nazionale Monza and finished on 21 October at the Algarve International Circuit. The series was open to Le Mans Prototypes in the LMP3 class, and grand tourer sports cars in the GT3 class.

Calendar
All races supported the 2017 European Le Mans Series except the Le Mans round, which was part of the 24 Hours of Le Mans weekend. On 4 May, the ACO revealed that 46 entries would take part in the Road To Le Mans for 2017, up from 42 the previous year.

Entry list

LMP3

GT3

Race results
Bold indicates overall winner.

Standings
Points are awarded according to the following structure (except Le Mans):

For Le Mans:

LMP3 Driver's championships (top-5)

GT3 Driver's championships (top-5)

LMP3 Team's championships (top-5)

GT3 Team's championships (top-5)

References

External links
 

2017 in motorsport
2017 in European sport